Micralarctia toulgoeti is a moth of the family Erebidae. It was described by Watson in 1988. It is found in Somalia.

References

 Natural History Museum Lepidoptera generic names catalog

Spilosomina
Moths described in 1988